Muppalla Try

Nagayalanka is a village in Krishna district of Indian state of Andhra Pradesh. It is the mandal headquarters of Nagayalanka mandal in Machilipatnam revenue division.

Geography

. It has an average elevation of 10 metres .

Demographics 

 census, the village had a population of 9,321. The total population constitute, 4,851 males and 4,470 females —a sex ratio of 922 females per 1000 males. 744 children are in the age group of 0–6 years, of which 431 are boys and 313 are girls —a ratio of 726 per 1000. The average literacy rate stands at 83.56% with 7,167 literates, significantly higher than the state average of 67.41%.

Economy 

Along with the collaboration of state government Andhra Pradesh and ministry of finance government of India, DRDO officially announced its missile launching station in Nagayalanka. All other procedures for establishing the same were cleared as on 28 June 2018.

References 

Villages in Krishna district
Mandal headquarters in Krishna district